Silver Linings Playbook is a 2012 American romantic comedy-drama film written and directed by David O. Russell. The film was based on Matthew Quick’s 2008 novel The Silver Linings Playbook. It stars Bradley Cooper and Jennifer Lawrence, with Robert De Niro, Jacki Weaver, Chris Tucker, Anupam Kher, John Ortiz and Julia Stiles in supporting roles.

The story takes place in Ridley Park, Pennsylvania. Cooper plays Patrizio "Pat" Solitano Jr., a man with bipolar disorder who is released from a psychiatric hospital and moves back in with his parents (De Niro and Weaver). Pat is determined to win back his estranged wife. He meets a young widow, Tiffany Maxwell (Lawrence), who offers to help him get his wife back if he enters a dance competition with her. The two become closer as they train, and Pat, his father, and Tiffany examine their relationships with each other as they cope with their situations.

Silver Linings Playbook premiered at the 2012 Toronto International Film Festival on September 8, 2012, and was released in the United States on November 16, 2012. The film opened to significant critical acclaim, with praise drawn to Russell's direction, and the performances of Cooper and Lawrence. Among its many accolades, the film received eight Academy Award nominations, including for Best Picture, Best Director, and Best Adapted Screenplay. It became the first film since 1981's Reds to be Oscar-nominated for the four acting categories and the first since 2004's Million Dollar Baby to be nominated for the Big Five Oscars, with Lawrence winning the Academy Award for Best Actress in a Leading Role and becoming the second-youngest Best Actress winner. It also achieved four Golden Globe Award nominations, with Lawrence winning Best Actress; three BAFTA nominations, with Russell winning for Best Adapted Screenplay; four Screen Actors Guild nominations; and five Independent Spirit Award nominations, winning in four categories, including Best Feature. The film was a success at the box office, grossing over $236 million worldwide.

Plot 
After eight months' treatment in a mental health facility for bipolar disorder, Patrizio "Pat" Solitano Jr. is released into the care of his parents, Patrizio Sr. and Dolores, at his childhood home in Upper Darby, Pennsylvania. His primary focus is to reconcile with his ex-wife, Nikki. She has moved away and obtained a restraining order against him after Pat found her in the shower with another man and badly beat him.

Pat's therapist, Cliff Patel, tries to convince him to keep taking his medication, as a repeat of his violent outbursts might send him back to the clinic. Pat tells him that he has a new outlook on life: He attempts to see the good, or silver linings, in all that he experiences. Meanwhile, Pat experiences a series of anxiety attacks.

Pat attends dinner at his best friend Ronnie's house and meets Ronnie's sister-in-law, Tiffany Maxwell, a widow with an unnamed disorder. They connect, talking about different drugs they have taken to manage their mental illnesses. She tries to offer him casual sex, but Pat is focused on getting Nikki back. Trying to get closer to him, Tiffany offers to deliver a letter to Nikki if, in return, he partners with her in an upcoming dance competition. Pat agrees and they start practicing over the following weeks. Starting to develop feelings for Tiffany, he tries to push them away. Pat believes the competition will be a good way to show Nikki he has changed.

Patrizio Sr., hoping to open his restaurant, has resorted to illegal bookmaking. Having bet most of his money on a Philadelphia Eagles game, he asks Pat to attend for good luck. So, Pat asks Tiffany for time off from practice to attend the game. She gives him a typed reply from Nikki, which cautiously hints they may be able to reconcile. Before entering the stadium, Pat and his brother Jake get into a fight with some racist fans and are hauled away by the police. The Eagles lose the game, and Patrizio is furious.

When Patrizio claims that the Eagles lost because of Tiffany being involved in Pat's life, she refutes his allegations by pointing out that the Philadelphia teams had done better whenever she and Pat were together. Convinced, Patrizio makes a parlay with Randy: If the Eagles win their next game and Tiffany and Pat score five out of ten in their dance competition, he will win back double the money he lost on the first bet. 

Pat is reluctant, so Tiffany, Dolores, and Patrizio conspire to persuade him to dance in the competition, telling him Nikki will be there. Noticing that the letter from Nikki also refers to "reading the signs", a phrase frequently used by Tiffany, he realizes that she wrote the letter.

Tiffany, Pat, and their friends and family arrive at the competition on the night of the football game. Tiffany despairs when she sees Nikki in the audience, invited by Ronnie and his wife [Tiffany's sister] Veronica. They want Nikki to lift her restraining order on Pat and give them the chance to reconcile. Tiffany starts to drink heavily at the bar. 

Pat finds Tiffany moments before their dance and drags her onto the dance floor. They begin their routine as the Eagles defeat the Dallas Cowboys. After their set, Tiffany and Pat receive an average score of exactly 5.0 points, amid cheers from friends and family and confused looks from the crowd.

Pat approaches Nikki and whispers into her ear. When Tiffany sees this she runs off, so Pat leaves Nikki and chases her. He hands her a letter, in which he admits to knowing she forged the letter. He confesses that he loved her from the moment he met her, though it took him a long time to realize it. They share a kiss. Patrizio opens a restaurant with the money he has won, and Pat and Tiffany begin a relationship, no longer wearing their wedding rings.

Cast

Production

Development 

Renee Witt, an executive at The Weinstein Company, convinced Harvey Weinstein to option the book by Matthew Quick on which the film is based, doing so before it was published. Sydney Pollack then began developing for David O. Russell to direct. Pollack told Russell that the film adaptation would be tricky because of the story's mixture of troubling emotion, humor, and romance. Russell estimates he rewrote the script twenty times over five years. Russell was drawn to the story because of the family relationships and the connection he felt to his own son, who has bipolar disorder and OCD.

The film was shot in 33 days. A darker, more extreme version of the dance sequence was filmed and scenes with De Niro's character were shot in multiple versions, with the character harsher or warmer, as Russell worked with editor Jay Cassidy to set the balance they wanted.

The locations are Upper Darby, Ridley Park, and Lansdowne communities just outside Philadelphia, Pennsylvania. Although not mentioned by name in the film, Ridley Park is credited at the end, and a police officer can be seen wearing the initials "RPPD" on his collar.

The film takes place over the second half of the 2008 NFL football season, which saw the Philadelphia Eagles advance to the NFC Championship Game. Several games are mentioned, including the Eagles' victories over Seattle and San Francisco, their losses to two of their NFC East rivals Washington Redskins and the New York Giants (which was the game Pat was attending when the fight broke out), and their victory over Dallas in the regular season's final game.

Casting 
Russell initially intended to make the film with Vince Vaughn and Zooey Deschanel, but went on to make The Fighter instead. Mark Wahlberg was set to work with Russell for the fourth time but had to drop out after delays in production created a scheduling conflict.

Russell had originally planned to work with Bradley Cooper on an adaptation of Pride and Prejudice and Zombies, having been impressed with Cooper's performance in Wedding Crashers, citing his "good bad-guy energy" and unpredictability as justification for casting. Cooper told Russell "he had been heavier and angrier and more fearful" at the time of that performance and had drawn on those feelings for it. Russell was excited that Cooper would bring those qualities to Pat Solitano.

Anne Hathaway was cast as Tiffany Maxwell, but due to scheduling conflicts with The Dark Knight Rises and creative differences with Russell, she dropped out. Other actresses who were considered for the part included Elizabeth Banks, Kirsten Dunst, Angelina Jolie, Blake Lively, Rooney Mara, Rachel McAdams, Andrea Riseborough and Olivia Wilde.

Initially, Russell did not believe Lawrence's age was suitable for the role. He thought Lawrence (21 at the time of filming) was too young to play opposite Cooper (37), but her audition changed his mind, admitting that the "expressiveness in her eyes and in her face" was "ageless". Russell compares Lawrence to the character Tiffany, describing her as confident but one of the least neurotic people he knows, with the confidence and glimpses of vulnerability needed to play Tiffany. Tiffany went through several iterations. She was initially meant to be goth. Lawrence dyed her hair black and did test shoots in heavy goth makeup, but Weinstein disapproved. The final version of her character remained messed-up yet confident, with small goth touches such as the dark hair and a cross. Specifically for the role, Lawrence was asked by Russell to put on weight and to speak in a lower register.

According to Entertainment Weekly, Lawrence said she didn't have a handle on Tiffany at first, which was what excited her about the role. "She was just a character I one-hundred percent did not understand at all... She's like, 'I'm messed up, I'm not like everybody else, I've got issues. Take it or leave it because I like myself.

Lawrence and Cooper had no previous dance experience. In less than a month, Mandy Moore, a choreographer for So You Think You Can Dance, taught them the dance sequences. Moore describes Cooper as having "some real natural dancing ability". Lawrence said of the climactic ballroom dance, "None of that was improvised, absolutely not. I'm a terrible dancer, so I would never have been able to do any of that. When it finally came together, that scene really was just as fun as it feels."

Release 
The film premiered at the 2012 Toronto International Film Festival on September 8, 2012, where it won the People's Choice Award. It opened at the 2012 Mumbai Film Festival on October 18, 2012, and received a limited release in the United States on November 16, 2012, opening wider later that week.

The Weinstein Company initially planned an unusually wide release for Silver Linings Playbook, going nationwide on an estimated 2,000 screens. They were encouraged by positive reviews and hoping to capitalize on Thanksgiving to do more business. Instead, they took a more slow-burn approach, opening in fewer theaters, expanding gradually, in a strategy to build up word-of-mouth support. Continuing the slow release the film expanded to 700 theaters on December 25.

Home media 
Silver Linings Playbook was released on DVD and Blu-ray  on April 30, 2013 by Anchor Bay Entertainment.

Reception

Critical response 
Silver Linings Playbook premiered at the 2012 Toronto International Film Festival and was critically acclaimed. The film has an approval rating of 92% on Rotten Tomatoes based on 260 reviews, with an average rating of 8.2/10. The website's critical consensus reads, "Silver Linings Playbook walks a tricky thematic tightrope, but David O. Russell's sensitive direction and some sharp work from a talented cast gives it true balance." On Metacritic, which assigns a weighted mean rating out of 100 reviews from mainstream critics, the film holds an average score of 81, based on reviews from 45 critics, indicating "universal acclaim". Audiences surveyed by CinemaScore gave the film an average grade of "A−" on an A+ to F scale.

Cooper and Lawrence were lauded for their performances. Kevin Jagernauth of The Playlist praised the film as "an enormously entertaining, crowd-pleasing winner" and noted that the performances from the two leads were "carefully developed, and perfectly pitched", deserving of awards. David Rooney of The Hollywood Reporter said that "the chemistry between Cooper and Lawrence makes them a delight to watch" and that their performances anchor the ensemble cast who also give great performances even in small roles. Rooney also complimented the "invigorating messiness" and "nervous energy" of the choreography. Richard Corliss of Time magazine also applauded the performances of the leads, particularly Lawrence, stating that her performance is "the reason to stay" to watch the whole movie, and praising her maturity.

Russell's direction was also widely acclaimed, with Justin Chang of Variety writing: "Never one to shy away from unlikely sources of comedy, David O. Russell tackles mental illness, marital failure and the curative powers of football with bracingly sharp and satisfying results." Eric Kohn of Indiewire gave the film an "A−" grade, praising the performances of both Cooper and Lawrence and also Russell's directing, stating that "both as solo screenwriter and director, Russell assembles a small, bubbly cast for an unexpectedly charming romcom that frequently dances — at one point, quite literally — between cynicism and bittersweetness with largely winning results." Ann Hornaday of The Washington Post remarked on Russell's skill, noting how "in any other hands, the adaptation of Matthew Quick's novel would be the stuff of banal rom-com fluff or, perhaps worse, self-consciously quirky indie cliches."

Roger Ebert gave the film three and a half out of four stars, saying that the film was "so good, it could almost be a terrific old classic" and described Russell's screenplay as "ingenious" for the way the major concerns of both the father and son pivot on the final bet.
Kenneth Turan called the film "a complete success" and the actors' performances "superb," including Chris Tucker in an "irresistible" supporting turn. Steven Rea of The Philadelphia Inquirer called the film "a transcendent endeavor, from its exhilaratingly smart screenplay... to the unexpected and moving turns of its two leads." Ricardo Baca of The Denver Post praised how the movie managed to maintain "the laughs, giddy anxiousness and warm butterflies from the trailer" for its entire length. Peter Travers of Rolling Stone called it "one of the year's best movies. It's crazy good."

Negative reviews of the film came from The New Yorker, whose critic David Denby called it "a miscalculation from beginning to end" and found Cooper's character "tiresome", while Richard Brody found Linings perhaps to "be the year's most artificial movie" and "the plot [...] utterly ridiculous." In a rare step outside the magazine's typical practices, Brody revisited the movie and wrote a supplementary review, once again condemning it as having "no characters but sets of switches, each of which has a binary set of options and all of which have to line up for things to come out right." Brody wrote, "I'm finding it hard not to make fun of the movie's highly constructed and narrow-bore array of givens, of plot points and their resolutions." Both critics found Lawrence's Oscar-winning performance "unconvincing." Denby wrote, "we don't believe [Tiffany] for a second when she says that, in her grief, she 'had sex with everyone in my office.' Lawrence is tough and proud, and always plays strong, and the remark doesn't track with anything we see onscreen." Brody finds Lawrence, "a poised and graceful actress", who "has none of the wildness that her character needs—and that lack of wildness is part of the reason for the movie's success."

Robbie Collin of The Daily Telegraph wrote that there's a "tiring fruitlessness to the mayhem", describing the lead character as a "rambling headcase", though noting Lawrence as the film's "only silver lining". The Globe and Mails chief film critic, Liam Lacey, gave three out of four stars, but wrote "you can easily see Silver Linings Playbook as a better-acted version of any number of Sundance-style films about quirky outsiders who find a common bond."

The NFL was critical of the gambling in the film and declined to broadcast an interview with Bradley Cooper and Chris Tucker during Thanksgiving.

Box office 
The film earned $443,003 in its opening weekend from 16 locations, facing strong competition from films including Skyfall and Lincoln. Expanding to 367 locations in its second week, the film moved to ninth place with $4.4 million. By December 30, it was showing at 745 theaters and had earned $27.3 million. On January 18, 2013, it earned $12.7 million when it expanded to 2,523 theaters, which boosted its total to $56.7 million. In its second weekend of playing in over 2500 theaters, its sales only declined by 12.2%. Gitesh Pandya stated it was well on its way to reaching the $100 million mark and could go much higher if it remained durable over the weeks.

Ray Subers forecast the film would earn $100 million, predicting that the film would start slow but keep going through December and gain a wide audience, bringing in fans of Lawrence and Cooper from their work on big franchise films, The Hunger Games and The Hangover, respectively. The film surpassed the $100 million mark in North America on February 19, 2013. As of May 11, 2013, the movie has become a sleeper box office hit, making over eleven times its budget.

Accolades 

The film was nominated for eight Academy Awards including Best Picture, Best Director for Russell, Best Adapted Screenplay, Best Film Editing, Best Actor for Cooper, Best Actress for Lawrence, Best Supporting Actor for De Niro and Best Supporting Actress for Weaver. Jennifer Lawrence's performance won the movie its only Academy Award and it made her the second-youngest winner in the Best Actress category, only behind Marlee Matlin in Children of a Lesser God.

Top ten lists 
 Cinemablend listed the film at 8 on its list of the year's 10 best.
 Critic Catherine Shoard of The Guardian listed the film at number 4 on her list of the year's 10 best.

Music

Soundtrack 

Silver Linings Playbook: Original Motion Picture Soundtrack is a soundtrack to the film of the same name, released in the United States by Sony Music Entertainment on November 16, 2012 for digital download.

The lead single from the soundtrack, "Silver Lining (Crazy 'Bout You)" peaked at #100 in the UK Singles. The soundtrack includes music from Stevie Wonder, the Dave Brubeck Quartet, Alt-J, Eagles of Death Metal, Jessie J and two tracks from the score composed by Danny Elfman.

Not featured on the soundtrack include Led Zeppelin's "What Is and What Should Never Be" and The White Stripes' "Hello Operator". Stevie Wonder's "Don't You Worry 'bout a Thing" and The White Stripes' "Fell in Love with a Girl" are played as the opening numbers of Pat and Tiffany's dance scene; "Misty" performed by Johnny Mathis, is played after Pat and Tiffany learn they received an average of 5.0 for their dance number. "Wild Is the Wind" performed by Nina Simone, which is played at the start of the film's end credits.

Also not on the soundtrack are, and the opening numbers of their dance scene

Score 

Danny Elfman's score for the film was released on digital download by Sony Music Entertainment simultaneously with the song album. "Goof Track" is not heard in the film.

References

External links 

 
 
 
 
 

2012 films
2012 romantic comedy-drama films
Adultery in films
American football films
American romantic comedy-drama films
American dance films
Ballroom dancing films
Films scored by Danny Elfman
Films about dance competitions
Films about dysfunctional families
Films about widowhood
Films about bipolar disorder
Films based on American novels
Films based on romance novels
Films directed by David O. Russell
Films featuring a Best Actress Academy Award-winning performance
Films featuring a Best Musical or Comedy Actress Golden Globe winning performance
Films set in 2008
Films set in psychiatric hospitals
Films set in Philadelphia
Films shot in Pennsylvania
Films whose writer won the Best Adapted Screenplay BAFTA Award
Films about gambling
Independent Spirit Award for Best Film winners
Philadelphia Eagles
Films about depression
BAFTA winners (films)
Toronto International Film Festival People's Choice Award winners
2012 comedy films
2012 drama films
The Weinstein Company films
2010s English-language films
Films produced by Bruce Cohen
2010s American films